Tier 1 Group formally known as Aggressive Training Solutions is a private company located in Crawfordsville AR founded by retired Marine Steve Reichert. Tier 1 Group provides military training in and outside the United States, as well as civilian tactical medicine, military medicine and law enforcement training.

History
Tier 1 Group is owned and funded by Cerberus Capital Management which also owns Remington Arms, Bushmaster Firearms International, LLC, Inc., and DPMS Panther Arms among other companies. Tier 1 Group was formed sometime around 2005.

Shooting range plans 
After efforts by Tier 1 Group to purchase land in Jones County, North Carolina to be used for a firing range and training facility, Jones County Commissioners passed an ordinance on January 25, 2008 to regulate commercial shooting ranges in the county. On February 1, 2008 Tier 1 Group filed a request to get  rezoned in the Bentonville Township in Johnston County, North Carolina.

Training of Khashoggi assassins

In June 2021, the New York Times reported that four Saudi operatives involved in the October 2018 kidnapping and murder of journalist Jamal Khashoggi had received paramilitary training from Tier 1 Group in 2017. The training, approved by the United States Department of State, included "safe marksmanship" and "countering an attack." Representatives of T1G stated the training was "protective in nature" and that the group was unaware of the Saudis' intentions to murder Khashoggi.

References

External links 
 Official site

Private military contractors
Companies based in North Carolina